Pseudomys is a genus of rodent that contains a wide variety of mice native to Australia and New Guinea.  They are among the few terrestrial placental mammals that colonised Australia without human intervention.

Natural history
This genus contains a number of species with different habits making generalisation difficult.  The overall body size varies widely, ranging from 60 to 160 mm.  The tail is 60–180 mm and the weight is recorded from 12 to 90 g.   They inhabit a wide variety of habitats from rainforests to plains and grasslands.  The animals are nocturnal and spend the day in burrows.  Food also varies with some species eating seeds, roots and insects while others feed primarily on grasses. The pebble-mound mice are unique in creating mounds of stones around their burrows. Several species of Pseudomys are threatened due to competition with introduced species and habitat destruction.  Several others are probably extinct.

Etymology
The name Pseudomys means "false mouse" presumably in reference to both its similarity and uniqueness from "true mice" in the genus Mus.

Species
Genus Pseudomys - Australian native mice
Ash-grey mouse, Pseudomys albocinereus
Silky mouse, Pseudomys apodemoides
Plains rat, Pseudomys australis
Bolam's mouse, Pseudomys bolami
Kakadu pebble-mound mouse, Pseudomys calabyi
Western pebble-mound mouse, Pseudomys chapmani
Little native mouse, Pseudomys delicatulus
Desert mouse, Pseudomys desertor
Smoky mouse, Pseudomys fumeus
Blue-gray mouse, Pseudomys glaucus †
Gould's mouse, Pseudomys gouldii
The Shark Bay mouse was previously described as a separate species Pseudomys fieldi, but is now considered conspecific with P. gouldii
Eastern chestnut mouse, Pseudomys gracilicaudatus
Sandy inland mouse, Pseudomys hermannsburgensis
Long-tailed mouse, Pseudomys higginsi
Central pebble-mound mouse, Pseudomys johnsoni
The Kimberley mouse was previously described as a separate species Pseudomys laborifex, but is now considered conspecific with Pseudomys johnsoni
Western chestnut mouse, Pseudomys nanus
New Holland mouse, Pseudomys novaehollandiae
Western mouse, Pseudomys occidentalis
Hastings River mouse, Pseudomys oralis
Country mouse, Pseudomys patrius
Pilliga mouse, Pseudomys pilligaensis
Heath mouse, Pseudomys shortridgei
Pseudomys vandycki † (Late Pliocene of Australia)

References

Musser, G. G. and M. D. Carleton. 2005. Superfamily Muroidea. pp. 894–1531 in Mammal Species of the World a Taxonomic and Geographic Reference. D. E. Wilson and D. M. Reeder eds. Johns Hopkins University Press, Baltimore.
Nowak, R. M. 1999. Walker's Mammals of the World, Vol. 2. Johns Hopkins University Press, London.

 
Rodent genera
Taxa named by John Edward Gray